Mikk Pahapill (born 18 July 1983) is a retired Estonian decathlete. His personal best score is 8398 points, achieved at the 2011 Hypo-Meeting in Götzis. His coach is Remigija Nazarovienė. He won the 2009 European Indoor Championships in heptathlon with 6362 points, which is currently the 10th all-time result.

Pahapill was born in Kuressaare.  Pahapill was the runner-up at the 2009 Décastar meeting with a then personal best score of 8255 points and runner-up at the 2011 competition with a result of 8184 points. He was also the runner-up at the 2010 European Cup Combined Events in Tallinn, recording a total of 8198 points to finish behind Romain Barras. Pahapill finished fourth at the 2010 European Championships where he broke his then personal record.

Achievements

Personal bests

Outdoors

Indoors

References

External links
 
 
 
 Profile at EEA Athlete Database
 The Sports.org Profile
 

1983 births
Living people
Sportspeople from Kuressaare
Estonian decathletes
Olympic athletes of Estonia
Athletes (track and field) at the 2008 Summer Olympics
World Athletics Championships athletes for Estonia